John Firminger Duthie (1845–1922) was an English botanist and explorer.  From 1875 to 1903 he was the Superintendent of Saharanpur Botanical Gardens. His son was the British Army officer and cricketer Arthur Duthie.

References

1845 births
1922 deaths
English botanists
Place of birth missing